Vanning may refer to:
 Vanning - a type of ore dressing by which ores are washed on a shovel.
 Vanning (hobby) - a hobby practiced by aficionados of tricked-out conversion vans.
 Vanning (music) - to indulge in the lyrical mastery of Van Morrison.